JP Elektroprivreda HZHB d.d. is a public power utility company based in Mostar, Bosnia and Herzegovina.

History

JP Elektroprivreda HZHB d.d. was formed on 28 August 1992 on Croats of Bosnia and Herzegovina and HVO dominated territory, and used as public utility company for territory of defunct Croatian Community of Herzeg-Bosnia. In 1999, EPHZHB had the electricity generation capacity of 762 MW, all from hydro power plants, while its distribution-level consumption was 1,075 GWh. On May 20, 2004 it became an entity government-owned publicly traded company.

In March 2018, EPHZHB launched a 50.6 MW Mesihovina wind power plant, located near the northwestern town of Tomislavgrad. It consists of 22 turbines and can produce 165.2 GWh of power a year, enough to supply 27,500 households.

Power generation and consumption
GWh

Source 2010–2015, 2016 2017, 2018

Structure
90% of company stock is owned by Federation of Bosnia and Herzegovina entity government. It is listed at Sarajevo Stock Exchange.

Operations
The company operates mostly in Croatian-majority cantons and municipalities in Bosnia-Herzegovina, covering approximately 25% of the country's territory. It is the third largest utility company in the country, with 2,325 GWh of electricity generation in 2015 (14,8% of the total generation in the country). It employs over 1,500 people and operates seven hydropower plants and one wind power plant:
 Čapljina Hydroelectric Power Station, Čapljina
 Rama Hydroelectric Power Station, Prozor-Rama
 HE "Mostar", Mostar
 Mostarsko Blato Hydroelectric Power Station, Mostar  
 Jajce-1 HPP, Jajce
 Jajce-2 HPP, Jajce
 MHE "Peć Mlini", Grude
 Mesihovina wind power plant (hr), Tomislavgrad

See also
 Elektroprivreda Bosne i Hercegovine
 Elektroprivreda Republike Srpske

References

External links
 

Electric power companies of Bosnia and Herzegovina
Companies based in Mostar
Government-owned companies of Bosnia and Herzegovina
Government-owned energy companies